James Speed may refer to:

 James Speed (1812–1887), US Attorney General
 James Speed (Australian politician) (1856–1925), Australian politician
 James Breckenridge Speed (1844–1912), president of the Louisville Railway Company
 James Stephens Speed (1811–1860), Mayor of Louisville, Kentucky